Darbast (also Romanized as Dārbast) is a village in Faramarzan Rural District, Jenah District, Bastak County, Hormozgan Province, Iran. At the 2006 census, its population was 450, in 90 families.

References 

Populated places in Bastak County